Hardcore is a 2001 British documentary film about the pornographic film industry directed by Stephen Walker. The film's music was composed by Richard Attree.

The film focused on pornographic actors and directors Rob Zicari, David Christopher, Mark Handel, Max Hardcore, Brandon Iron and Mr. Marcus and the perspectives of actresses in the industry.

Cast
 Robert Black
 David Christopher
 Mark Handel
 Max Hardcore
 Brandon Iron
 Layla Jade
 Joel Lawrence
 Mr. Marcus
 Lee-anne McQueen
 Dick Nasty
 Kyle Phillips
 Caroline Pierce
 Michael Stefano
 Steve Taylor
 Valentino

References

External links
 

2001 films
Films shot in Los Angeles
Films shot in California
Films set in the United States
British documentary films
2000s English-language films
2000s British films